The Vanilla Ice Project is an American reality television series on the DIY Network. It is hosted by construction contractor and rapper Rob Van Winkle, a.k.a. Vanilla Ice, who has significant experience with home improvement and real estate flipping. Ice began purchasing houses in his early twenties and became more involved in home improvement projects starting around 1998.

During the course of the series, 105 episodes of The Vanilla Ice Project aired over nine seasons.

Series overview

Episodes

Season 1 (2010–11)

Season 2 (2012)

Season 3 (2013)

Season 4 (2014)

Season 5 (2015)

Season 6 (2016)

Season 7 (2017)

Season 8 (2018)

Season 9 (2019) 
In this season, Rob and the Ninjas stick to a $100,000 renovation budget.

Specials (2012–19)

References 

Lists of American non-fiction television series episodes
Lists of American reality television series episodes
Vanilla Ice